The following is a list of squads for each nation competing in 2019 EAFF E-1 Football Championship (women) in Busan, South Korea. Each nation must submit a squad of 23 players, including 3 goalkeepers.

Age, caps and goals as of the start of the tournament, 10 December 2019.

Head coach: Jia Xiuquan

Source:

Head coach:  Kazuo Echigo

Source:

Head coach: Asako Takakura

Source:

Head coach:  Colin Bell

Source:

References

EAFF E-1 Football Championship squads (women)